Salafism among Kurds refers to the history of the Salafi movement practiced by Kurds in Greater Kurdistan. The history of Salafism in Kurdistan is not contiguous and has a different history depending on which part of Kurdistan.

In Iranian Kurdistan 
Salafism in Iranian Kurdistan is relatively new. It was a very small and uncommon ideology before. However, since the early 2000s, it had been making a significant rise among the Kurds in Iran. It gained fame when Hassan Rouhani himself ordered the Ministry of Interior to do a deep research about the growth of Salafis in Iranian Kurdistan and Iraqi Kurdistan. It was confirmed that Salafism in the Kurdistan region of Iran was a result of Ansar al-Islam jihadists who fled Iraqi Kurdistan after the American attacks on the area and fleeing to Iran and openly spreading their ideology among the Kurds of Iran around 2003. Many of the original Kurdish parties in Iran are leftist, secular, and even communist, however in the past 2 decades, hundreds of Kurdish clerics have been promoting Salafism which has risen significantly. In an official statement by the Ministry of Interior regarding the clerics, it said "Unfortunately, we are witnessing a new generation of Kurdish clerics who have nothing in common with the Kurdish clerics who are known for tolerance." It was stated that "after the Fall of Saddam Hussein and the rise of the Salafis in Iraqi Kurdistan, the trend gradually spread to Iranian Kurdistan." There has also been radicalization of Iranian Kurds, with many of them travelling to Syria, Iraq, and Afghanistan to join Salafi jihadist groups. A Salafist Kurd by the name of Saryas Sadeqi detonated his explosive vest outside of the Mausoleum of Ruhollah Khomeini, killing himself and damaging the shrine in the process. It was again agreed that "most of the Salafi jihadis in Iranian Kurdistan had been influenced ideologically and religiously by Iraqi Kurds". Iranian Kurds were one of the main reason that the Islamic Emirate of Byara survived, Iranian Kurdish collaborators with Ansar al-Islam would smuggle goods across the Iran–Iraq border to Byara.

In Iraqi Kurdistan 
The growth of Salafism in Iraqi Kurdistan dates back to the mid-1980s. There was a rivalry between the new Salafi movement and the traditional way of Islam among Kurds, which leaned more towards Sufism. After the Kurdish uprisings against Saddam Hussein, the increase of Kurdish Islamists began, under what was known as the Islamic Awakening, or the Kurdish mujahideen. The secular KRG initially were okay with the growth of Salafism, allowing the Salafis to have gatherings and freely preach, due to the secular Kurds and Islamist Kurds having one enemy, that being Saddam Hussein. The Kurdish Islamic awakening would later decline due to heavy pressure from the United States and the secular Kurdish parties. Saudi Arabia funded and was a supporter of the IMK. Iraqi Kurdistan is the part of Kurdistan with the most Salafis. Iraqi After the 2003 invasion of Iraq and the fall of Saddam Hussain, another spark of Salafism was revived in Iraqi Kurdistan. Ansar al-Islam is the most known Salafist group in Iraqi Kurdistan, who even went as far as establishing their own mini-state in 2001. Ansar al-Islam grew very quickly and had big influence. It was so significant that it led to the formation of CTG Kurdistan to counter Ansar al-Islam. Their influence grew to the point that in Baghdad 2003, Iraqi Arab members of Al-Qaeda in Iraq ended up killing some Ansar al-Islam Kurdish youths due to fears that Kurds were becoming the most influential jihadists in Iraq, therefore replacing AQI. There was also an assassination attempt on the Prime Minister of Iraq, Ayad Allawi, in Germany by the Ansar al-Islam operative Rafik Yousef. There are many Salafi schools in the Kurdish language all around the Kurdistan Region in the cities of Sulaymaniyah, Erbil, Halabja, and Duhok. The KRG later banned many Salafi books and has limited the privileges of Salafi imams. Many Salafi imams were fired for their speeches which the KRG disapproved of. The crackdown on Salafism by the KRG has not stopped the growth of Salafism in Iraqi Kurdistan. On the contrary, the Salafist influence and popularity of Mullah Krekar has grown, mostly due to his populist views, his statements which he expresses care and support for Kurds, and his criticism against Kurdophobia, which many Kurds say that the KRG does not do. It has not only boosted Mullah Krekar's image, but also boosted dissent against the KRG.

In Syrian Kurdistan 
Salafism is generally frowned upon in Syrian Kurdistan after the rise of Islamic State. The AANES and their SDF, which include the YPG and YPJ, have done a strict crackdown on Salafism in an attempt to secularize the region. There have been two Kurdish Salafist movements from Syrian Kurdistan, such as the Movement of Salah al-Din the Kurd and the Kurdish Islamic Front. Both of those groups consider themself Kurdish movements and both have constantly stated that the protection of Kurds, Kurdish rights, and the Kurdish language are their priority. However they both remained unpopular and the Kurdish Islamic Front disbanded due to it failing to find support.

In Turkish Kurdistan 
The Kurdish-majority areas in Southeast Anatolia have been known for being more religious and conservative than the Turkish-majority areas, often leading to radicalization. Ibn Taymiyyah, the man who inspired Salafism, was from Harran, in the Şanlıurfa Province, considered to be part of Turkish Kurdistan. In recent times, a wave of Kurds from Bingöl and Adıyaman have been adopting Salafism. Adiyaman, a Kurdish-majority city, was formerly known for its tobacco growing. Although the city would later gain a new and infamous reputation, which was having the deadliest terror cell in Turkey. Between 2014 and 2015, 45 families from Bingöl have alerted the Turkish authorities that one of their family members went to Syria or Iraq to join the Islamic State. A student from Diyarbakır who went to study in Bingöl stated that "Nobody should be surprised. Radicalisation of the Kurds in Bingöl and elsewhere started long before the appearance of the Islamic State." Although not all would join the Islamic State, some Kurds from Turkey would travel to Syria to join the Movement of Salah al-Din the Kurd, which was also a Kurdish movement in addition to being a Salafist organization. The Salafi Kurds, along with the other Salafis, even considered Erdoğan and the AKP as kuffar.

References 

Salafi movement
Islamic fundamentalism
Religion in Kurdistan